The Journal of the Marine Biological Association of the United Kingdom is a peer-reviewed scientific journal that was established in August 1887. Originally set up to provide members of the Marine Biological Association of the United Kingdom with "notes and reports concerning the work of the Association" along with "brief records of observations relating to the marine biology and fisheries of the coasts of the United Kingdom". Since 1937 the journal has been published by Cambridge University Press on behalf of the association. According to the Journal Citation Reports, the journal has a 2017 impact factor of 1.403.

References

External links

 volumes 1-11 at Biodiversity Heritage Library

Academic journals associated with learned and professional societies of the United Kingdom
Biology in the United Kingdom
Biology journals
Cambridge University Press academic journals
Publications established in 1887
English-language journals
1887 establishments in the United Kingdom
8 times per year journals